A general election was held in the United Kingdom between 31 March and 27 April 1880 and all 60 seats in Scotland were contested. Of particular note was the Scottish-based Midlothian campaign of William Gladstone.

Results
Below is a table summarising the results of the 1880 general election in Scotland.

University constituencies

Votes summary

See also

References

1880 in Scotland
1880s elections in Scotland
1880
Scotland